Dome 3 is the third studio album by the English post-punk band Dome, released in 1981 by the record label Dome.

Content 

Trouser Press wrote that Dome 3 "breaks stride" from Dome's previous releases, "lifting the beats of other cultures and mixing them with abstracted bits of psychedelia and disembodied noises."

Track listing 

All songs written by Bruce Gilbert and Graham Lewis unless otherwise indicated.

Personnel 
Credits adapted from liner notes.

Engineering
 Eric Radcliffe
 John Fryer

Dome
 Bruce Gilbert - vocals, instruments, production
 Graham Lewis - vocals, instruments, production

Additional Musicians
 A.M.C. - vocals (tracks 1, 2, 6, 9, 10)
 Peter Price - drums, percussion (tracks 1, 2, 4, 5, 7)
 D.O. Miller - saxophone (tracks 1, 5, 7)
 Russell Mills - percussion, vocals (tracks 2, 5)
 Eric Radcliffe - guitar (track 2)

References

External links 

 

1981 albums
Dome (band) albums